Guanidine is the compound with the formula HNC(NH2)2. It is a colourless solid that dissolves in polar solvents. It is a strong base that is used in the production of plastics and explosives. It is found in urine predominantly in patients experiencing renal failure. A guanidine moiety also appears in larger organic molecules, including on the side chain of arginine.

Structure 
Guanidine can be thought of as a nitrogenous analogue of carbonic acid. That is, the C=O group in carbonic acid is replaced by a C=NH group, and each OH is replaced by a  group. Isobutene can be seen as the carbon analogue in much the same way. A detailed crystallographic analysis of guanidine was elucidated 148 years after its first synthesis, despite the simplicity of the molecule. In 2013, the positions of the hydrogen atoms and their displacement parameters were accurately determined using single-crystal neutron diffraction.

Production
Guanidine can be obtained from natural sources, being first isolated by Adolph Strecker via the degradation of guanine. It was first synthesized in 1861 by the oxidative degradation of an aromatic natural product, guanine, isolated from Peruvian guano.

A laboratory method of producing guanidine is gentle (180-190 °C) thermal decomposition of dry ammonium thiocyanate  in anhydrous conditions:
3 NH4SCN -> 2 CH5N3 + H2S + CS2

The commercial route involves a two step process starting with the reaction of dicyandiamide with ammonium salts. Via the intermediacy of biguanidine, this ammonolysis step affords salts of the guanidinium cation (see below). In the second step, the salt is treated with base, such as sodium methoxide.

Chemistry

Guanidinium cation
With a pKb of 0.4, guanidine is a strong base. Most guanidine derivatives are in fact salts containing the conjugate acid.

The conjugate acid is called the guanidinium cation,. This planar, symmetric ion consists of three amino groups each bonded to the central carbon atom with a covalent bond of order 4/3. It is a highly stable +1 cation in aqueous solution due to the efficient resonance stabilization of the charge and efficient solvation by water molecules. As a result, its pKaH is 13.6 meaning that guanidine is a very strong base in water; in neutral water, it exists almost exclusively as guanidinium.

Testing for guanidine
Guanidine can be selectively detected using sodium 1,2-naphthoquinone-4-sulfonic acid (Folin's reagent) and acidified urea.

Uses

Industry
The main salt of commercial interest is the nitrate [C()3]. It is used as a propellant, for example in air bags.

Medicine
Since the Middle Ages in Europe, guanidine has been used to treat diabetes as the active antihyperglycemic ingredient in French lilac. Due to its long-term hepatotoxicity, further research for blood sugar control was suspended at first after the discovery of insulin. Later development of nontoxic, safe biguanides led to the long-used first-line diabetes control medicine metformin, introduced to Europe in the 1950s & United States in 1995 and now prescribed to over 17 million patients per year in the US.

Guanidinium chloride is a now-controversial  adjuant in treatment of botulism. Recent studies have shown some significant subsets of patients who see no improvement after the administration of this drug.

Biochemistry
Guanidine exists protonated, as guanidinium, in solution at physiological pH.

Guanidinium chloride (also known as guanidine hydrochloride) has chaotropic properties and is used to denature proteins. Guanidinium chloride is known to denature proteins with a linear relationship between concentration and free energy of unfolding. In aqueous solutions containing 6 M guanidinium chloride, almost all proteins lose their entire secondary structure and become randomly coiled peptide chains. Guanidinium thiocyanate is also used for its denaturing effect on various biological samples. 

Recent studies suggest that guanidinium is produced by bacteria as a toxic byproduct. To alleviate the toxicity of guanidinium, bacteria have developed a class of transporters known as guanidinium exporters or Gdx proteins to expel the extra amounts of this ion to the outside of the cell.  Gdx proteins, are highly selective for guanidinium and mono-substituted guanidinyl compounds and share an overlapping set of non-canonical substrates with drug exporter EmrE.

Other
Guanidinium hydroxide is the active ingredient in some non-lye hair relaxers.

Guanidine derivatives

Guanidines are a group of organic compounds sharing a common functional group with the general structure . The central bond within this group is that of an imine, and the group is related structurally to amidines and ureas. Examples of guanidines are arginine, triazabicyclodecene, saxitoxin, and creatine.

Galegine is an isoamylene guanidine.

See also 
:Category:Guanidines
Sakaguchi test
Y-aromaticity
Amidine

References

Guanidines
Bases (chemistry)